Anastasia Khoroshilova (born 1978 in Moscow, Russia) is an artist. She currently spends her time in both Moscow and Berlin. She belongs to "The Russian Union of Art Photographers" in 1997. Anastasia Khoroshilova studied photography at the University of Duisburg-Essen in Germany. Since 2012 she has lectured for "Project Photography" at the Rodchenko Moscow School of Photography and Multimedia, Rodchenko Art School. In 2016 she became a member of "Deutsche Fotografische Akademie", the German Academy of Photography.

References

1978 births
Living people
21st-century Russian artists
21st-century Russian women artists
Russian women photographers
Artists from Moscow
21st-century women photographers